Carlos Andrés Bruderer (born 6 January 1967) is a Guatemalan alpine skier. He competed in three events at the 1988 Winter Olympics.

References

1967 births
Living people
Guatemalan male alpine skiers
Olympic alpine skiers of Guatemala
Alpine skiers at the 1988 Winter Olympics
Place of birth missing (living people)